Lawrence "Lawrie" Fernandes (1929 – 22 January 1995) was an Indian hockey player who competed in the 1948 Summer Olympics.

External links
 
 Profiles of eminent Goans, past and present

1929 births
1995 deaths
Field hockey players from Goa
Olympic field hockey players of India
Field hockey players at the 1948 Summer Olympics
Indian male field hockey players
Olympic gold medalists for India
Olympic medalists in field hockey
Medalists at the 1948 Summer Olympics
Indian Roman Catholics